Kildare was a constituency represented in the Irish House of Commons to 1801.

History
In the Patriot Parliament of 1689 summoned by James II, Kildare Borough was represented with two members.

Members of Parliament
1560 John Abells and John Moore
1585 John Wesley and William Shirgold
1613–1615 Thomas Farbeck and Walter Fitzgerald
1634–1635 Christopher Wandesford and Philip Pilsworth
1639–1642 Christopher Wandesford (replaced by Nicholas Whyte) and Sir George Wentworth  (died and replaced 1641 by Patrick Sarsfield) (Whyte and Sarsfield expelled 1642) 
1642–1649 Alexander Borrowes (died and replaced 1643 by Robert Kennedy) 
1661–1666 Francis Peasley (sat for Newcastle – replaced by Sir Thomas Harman) and John Pecke

1689–1801

Notes

References

Bibliography

Constituencies of the Parliament of Ireland (pre-1801)
Historic constituencies in County Kildare
Kildare (town)
1800 disestablishments in Ireland
Constituencies disestablished in 1800